Harbour Centre Development Limited is a subsidiary of Wharf Real Estate Investment Company of Hong Kong and engages in the operation of hotels and restaurants, and the property development business in Hong Kong and Mainland China. It was founded and listed on the Hong Kong Stock Exchange in 1971.

References

External links 
 

Companies listed on the Hong Kong Stock Exchange
Real estate companies established in 1971
Land developers of Hong Kong
1971 establishments in Hong Kong